Eugene Hoffman "Red" Edwards (March 15, 1904 – December 22, 1981) was an American football player and coach.

After graduating from Weston High School in Weston, West Virginia, Edwards played quarterback for Knute Rockne at the University of Notre Dame.  As a two-year starter, he led the team to a record of 7-2-1 in 1925, and 9-1 as a captain in 1926.

Later in his career, while coaching at Saint Vincent College in Latrobe, Pennsylvania, Edwards was offered the head coaching position for the Pittsburgh Steelers by owner Art Rooney, but he declined.  In 1956, he and his wife Sarah (née Brewster) returned to his home town of Weston to accept a position with Citizens Bank, where he eventually became chairman of the board of directors in 1968.

Edwards was inducted into the West Virginia Sports Hall of Fame in 1970.

References
 Citizens Bank of Weston, 
 Gene Hoffman Edwards, 

1904 births
1981 deaths
American football quarterbacks
Notre Dame Fighting Irish football players
Saint Vincent Bearcats football coaches
People from Weston, West Virginia
Players of American football from West Virginia